Delia Smith's Cookery Course is a book, first published in the 1970s, by British chef Delia Smith. The book, reprinted many times, helped establish Smith's reputation as a leading cookery writer in the UK.

British cookbooks
1970s books